"21st Century Girl" is a song by American musician Willow Smith, released on March 1, 2011 through Roc Nation as a standalone single.

Background
On January 22, 2011, Willow released a 16-second preview of the song on her Facebook page. The video clip of the song shows Willow on the set of the music video. 21st Century Girl is an upbeat dance song and was produced by Swedish production team Twin.

Willow debuted the full song on February 28 by performing the song on The Oprah Winfrey Show. It was released on iTunes the following day on, March 1, 2011.

Live performances
Willow performed the song on The Oprah Winfrey Show, as well as at the 2011 Kids' Choice Awards. Willow performed at the White House Easter Egg Hunt. The song was also performed by Willow as a support act on UK dates of Justin Bieber's My World Tour.

Music video
The video was released on March 7, 2011, and shows Cicely Tyson playing a nomadic tribal woman pulling Willow from the sand in a desert. Willow and her friends in the video then begin to pull an entire city out of the desert. The video was shot in Los Angeles and was directed by Rich Lee.

Track listing
Digital download
"21st Century Girl" – 3:00
"21st Century Girl" (Jump Smokers Remix) - 3:29

Charts

References

 

2011 singles
2011 songs
Roc Nation singles
Willow Smith songs
Songs written by Joacim Persson
Song recordings produced by Twin (production team)
Songs written by Niclas Molinder
Songs written by Drew Ryan Scott
Music videos directed by Rich Lee